The End of Her Honeymoon is a 1913 novel by the British writer Marie Belloc Lowndes.

References

Bibliography
 Vinson, James. Twentieth-Century Romance and Gothic Writers. Macmillan, 1982.

1913 British novels
Novels by Marie Belloc Lowndes